Tony Brock (born 31 March 1954 in Poole, Dorset, England) is a British rock drummer, who is best known as the drummer and occasional vocalist for the English group the Babys.

He was originally a drummer for Spontaneous Combustion.  Through his tenure with the Babys, he enjoyed the respect of his fellow musicians and has since accompanied Rod Stewart, Roy Orbison, Jimmy Barnes and Elton John.

Several clips exist of his explosive drumming solos during Rod Stewart and Jimmy Barnes concerts.

During his time in Australia, he was part of the First XI Choir on The Twelfth Man's hit single "Marvellous!". 

He now has his own studio and specialises in engineering and production.

External links
 Tony Brock's Silver Dreams Studio
 Official website of The Babys

The Babys Official Unofficial Archives and Chronological History Based on the Archives of Adrian Millar and Michael John Siddons-Corby
The Babys Official Unofficial Myspace

Living people
1954 births
English rock drummers
The Babys members
People from Poole